A  mocha (Arabic: موكا) ( or ), also called mocaccino, is a chocolate-flavoured warm beverage that is a variant of a caffè latte, commonly served in a glass rather than a mug.  Other commonly used spellings are mochaccino and also mochachino. The name is derived from the city of Mokha, Yemen, which was one of the centres of early coffee trade. Like latte, the name is commonly shortened to just mocha.

Characteristics

Like café latte,  mocha is based on espresso and hot milk but with added chocolate flavouring and sweetener, typically in the form of cocoa powder and sugar. Many varieties use chocolate syrup instead, and some may contain dark or milk chocolate.

 mocha, in its most basic formulation, can also be referred to as hot chocolate with (e.g., a shot of) espresso added. Like cappuccino,  mochas typically contain the distinctive milk froth on top; as is common with hot chocolate, they are sometimes served with whipped cream instead. They are usually topped with a dusting of either cinnamon, sugar or cocoa powder, and marshmallows may also be added on top for flavour and decoration.

A variant is white  mocha, made with white chocolate instead of milk or dark. There are also variants of the drink that mix the two syrups; this mixture is referred to by several names, including black-and-white mocha, marble mocha, tan mocha, tuxedo mocha, and zebra mocha.

Another variant is a mochaccino which is an espresso shot (double) with either a combination of steamed milk and cocoa powder or chocolate milk. Both mochaccinos and  mocha can have chocolate syrup, whipped cream and added toppings such as cinnamon, nutmeg or chocolate sprinkles.

A third variant on the  mocha is to use a coffee base instead of espresso. The combination would then be coffee, steamed milk, and the added chocolate. This is the same as a cup of coffee mixed with hot chocolate. The caffeine content of this variation would then be equivalent to the coffee choice included.

See also
List of coffee beverages
List of hot beverages
Mocha, Yemen

References

	

Hot drinks
Yemeni cuisine
Espresso drinks